How Dare You? is the sixteenth album by Detroit rock band Electric Six and the thirteenth in their official canon. It was released on October 13, 2017. It is their longest studio album to date. Although this is not technically true as their 2007 album, I Shall Exterminate Everything Around Me That Restricts Me from Being the Master, is longer at 50 minutes. A single of the song "Arrive Alive" was released ahead of the album as an incentive to pre-order it.

Critical reception
Writing for AllMusic, Mark Deming called the album "Electric Six doing what they do best, with Dick Valentine's gloriously mannered vocals expounding on his myriad obsessions as the guitars, keys, and drums pop behind him like an exceptionally long string of firecrackers", awarding it  stars out of 5.

Steve Janes called it "the sound of a rock and roll band respecting its fans, giving them what we have to believe they want", stating that "'How Dare You’ moves seamlessly from the bouncy and poppy numbers like "Arrive Alive" and "She’s a Forgery" to the brooding and menacing "Dark Politics" and the title track "How Dare You"".

Track listing
All lyrics written by Tyler Spencer.

Personnel
 Dick Valentine - vocals
  - lead guitar, music writer (tracks 1–2, 4, 8–9, 13)
 Da Vé - rhythm guitar
 Tait Nucleus? - keyboards, music writer (7, 9–12)
 Rob Lower - bass
 Todd Glass - drums
 Chris Krez - horns (track 4)
 Zach Shipps - drum production

References

External links
https://www.discogs.com/Electric-Six-How-Dare-You/release/10957694

2017 albums
Electric Six albums
Metropolis Records albums